Paulo Emilio Borges Rocha or simply Paulo Emilio (born 14 May 1972) is a former Brazilian professional footballer.

Club career
He made his debut in the Russian Premier League in 1998 for FC Alania Vladikavkaz. He played 2 games in the UEFA Cup 2000–01 for FC Alania Vladikavkaz.

References

1972 births
Living people
Brazilian footballers
Association football forwards
Mogi Mirim Esporte Clube players
Esporte Clube Bahia players
FC Spartak Vladikavkaz players
FC Volgar Astrakhan players
Russian Premier League players
Brazilian expatriate footballers
Expatriate footballers in Russia